The Christian Classics Ethereal Library (CCEL) is a digital library that provides free electronic copies of Christian scripture and literature texts.

Description 

CCEL is a volunteer-based project founded and directed by Harry Plantinga, a professor of computer science at Calvin College. It was initiated at Wheaton College in 1993 and is currently supported by Calvin University. It includes Hymnary.org.

The purpose of the CCEL is simply "to build up Christ's church and to address fundamental questions of the faith." The documents in the library express a variety of theological views, sometimes conflicting with those of Calvin University.

CCEL stores texts in Theological Markup Language (ThML) format and automatically converts them into other formats such as HTML or Portable Document Format (PDF). Although they use mainly Public Domain texts, they claim copyright on all their formatting. Users must log into their website to download all formatted versions of the text.

CCEL is funded by advertisements, sales of cd-roms (available since 1997), sales of some books not freely downloadable, and individual gifts. Calvin University has also provided them with space, network access, and significant financial support.

As of 2006, the library was recording about 200,000 page views per day and providing about 2 TB of information (equivalent to over a million books) in a month.

A 2002 reviewer acknowledged that while the site is "intended to be a basic online theological library," it was actually much more valuable than that: it is "a treasure of primary sources for anyone teaching Western Civilization or more specialized courses in medieval or Reformation history."  They also specifically noted that the ability to search the music "for specific note patterns" was valuable to musicologists.

As of 2005, the primary users of the library fell into three main categories. These are university professors and their students using texts from the library as required reading without running up the students' bill for textbooks, people preparing sermons and Bible studies, and those reading for individual edification.

See also
 Internet Sacred Text Archive
 List of digital library projects
 New Advent
 Wikisource

References

External links

 

1993 establishments in the United States
American digital libraries
Christian libraries
Christian websites
Discipline-oriented digital libraries
Internet properties established in 1993
Libraries established in 1993
Online Scripture Search Engine
Publications of patristic texts